Đalović (also transliterated Djalović) is a Serbian surname. It may refer to:

 Radomir Đalović (born 1982), Montenegrin football player
 Marko Đalović (born 1986), Serbian football player

See also
 Đalovići, settlement

Serbian surnames